Jeffrey Hornaday is an American choreographer and film director. He has choreographed films such as Flashdance, Dick Tracy, Captain Eo and A Chorus Line .

Hornaday was nominated for a Directors Guild of America Award for his direction of the 2011 Disney Channel original movie Geek Charming. He received a second Directors Guild of America Award nomination for his direction of Disney's 2013 movie Teen Beach Movie which is the highest viewed non-sequel movie in cable television history. In 2003 he was nominated for the MTV Video Music Award for Best Choreography for adapting his dance routines from Flashdance for Jennifer Lopez in her music video I'm Glad. Hornaday has also directed multiple world tours for entertainers such as Madonna and Paul McCartney. Hornaday created specialized marketing campaigns for companies such as Sony and Nike, and has served as creative director for events featuring President Bill Clinton and President Barack Obama.

Personal life
From 1977 to 1985, Hornaday lived with actress Lesley Ann Warren. Hornaday dated Madonna for a short period in early 1989, between Madonna's separation from Sean Penn and emerging relationship with Warren Beatty.

Filmography

As actor
 The Best Little Whorehouse in Texas (1982, as Aggie)
 Walt Disney's Wonderful World of Color episode Double Switch (1987, as Choreographer)

As choreographer
 Flashdance (1983)
 D.C. Cab (1983)
 Romancing the Stone (1984, as Jeffrey D. Hornaday)
 Streets of Fire (1984)
 A Chorus Line (1985)
 Captain EO (1986)
 Tango & Cash (1989, as Jeff Hornaday)
 Dick Tracy (1990)
 The Marrying Man (1991)
 Life Stinks (1991)
 Carlito's Way (1993)
 Bird of Prey (1995)
 Sweet Jane (1998)

As choreographer and director
 ABC Afterschool Specials, episode Out of Step (1984)
 Teen Beach Movie (2013)
 Teen Beach 2 (2015)

As director
 CBS Summer Playhouse, episode Sawdust (1987)
 Madonna: Ciao, Italia! - Live from Italy documentary (1988, concert performances)
 Shout (1991)
 Geek Charming (2011)

Miscellaneous roles
 Portrait of a Showgirl (1982, as production assistant)
 Madonna: Ciao, Italia! - Live from Italy documentary (1988, as stage director)
 Madonna: The Girlie Show (1993, as production stager, stage producer)

Awards
 MTV Video Music Award for Best Choreography for I'm Glad (2003, nominated)
 Directors Guild of America Award for Best Director for Geek Charming (2012, nominated)

References

External links
 
 

Living people
American choreographers
American contemporary dancers
American film directors
Film choreographers
Yale University alumni
Place of birth missing (living people)
Year of birth missing (living people)
American male dancers